Alain Chivilò is an Italian contemporary art curator, critic and writer based in Venice and Milan. He began his studies on art during childhood with lessons held by Master Eugenio Da Venezia, starting around a post-impressionistic figurative way of expression generated by a group of modern artists working before and world war II in Italy. He studied art history and business administration at university, but he doesn't like to write these qualifications with the dr abbreviation or similar (doctor, phd, dottore, ext). More research, to deepen his education on contemporary art, has been done in cities such as London, Paris, Madrid as well as Milan, Venice and Rome.

In Venice he is one of the last artistic director to defend a nineteenth century masters group characterized by exploring nature, still life and portraits (Marco Novati, Eugenio Da Venezia, Neno Mori, Carlo Dalla Zorza, Fioravante Seibezzi, Cosimo Privato, Mario Varagnolo for example). In this context the art monographs “Gigi Candiani Tessere di vita”, “Marco Novati Volti Vissuti” and "Gigi Candiani Atmosfere Rarefatte" triggered in Italy a debate about the importance of these figurative artists in modern Italian art. 

As freelance writer he is collaborating with magazines as Art Review, Drawing, Art Style, Art Calling, Art&trA. During his career Chivilò interviewed artists as for example Sir Anthony Caro, Marc Quinn, Shozo Shimamoto, Hermann Nitsch, Jacques Villeglé, Fabrizio Plessi, Gianni Berengo Gardin, Riccardo Licata, Eugenio Carmi, Rabarama, Achille Perilli, Luca Alinari, Alberto Biasi, Xu Deqi, Helidon Xhixha. In June 2017 all these art contacts, that involved him, have been published in a new book: "Tracce Segni Macchie Bruciature Concetti Scatti Tagli Buchi".

As art critic a simplicity of expression (not banality) is a fundamental feature of his texts.  As art curator fundamental are the collaboration with Italian critics, for example Giovanni Faccenda and Vittorio Sgarbi. He has also organised exhibitions at Villa Pisani, Stra (Venice), Casa dei Carraresi (Treviso) and in other different Italian locations as Milan and Rome.

From 2013 to 2016 he studied and analyzed the ignorance and lack of communication in the Italian culture (different geographical areas). The project called Quod erat demonstrandum was a sort of global provocative act denouncing the current strength of commonplace generated by a culturally superficial society. Now he attempts to form the society towards a philosophy based on dialogue and listening.

Publications 
Recent edited anthologies include: 
Marco Novati Volti Vissuti 2015, Gigi Candiani Atmosfere Rarefatte 2016 and Tracce Segni Macchie Bruciature Concetti Scatti Tagli Buchi 2017.

Recent catalogue essays include: 
"Donald Martiny Divine Material" (ArteA, 2019), Alfredo Rapetti Mogol Parole Svelate" (ArteA, 2019), "Materials: Pino Pinelli, Elio Marchegiani, Mario Ceroli, Piero Gilardi, Roberto Barni, Enzo Cacciola, Umberto Mariani, Armando Marrocco, Giuseppe Uncini, Getulio Alviani, Jannis Kounellis, Alberto Burri and Gioni David Parra" (Armanda Gori Arte, Pietrasanta, 2018), "Antonio Amodio Fisionomie Elettive" (Casa dei Carraresi, Treviso, 2017), "Piero Slongo Ars" (Galleria d'arte moderna, San Donà di Piave, 2016), "Paola Romano Moon" (National Museum Villa Pisani, Stra Venice, 2015), "Stefano Benazzo La Naturalezza dell’Istante" (Casa dei Carraresi, Treviso, 2015), "Cinzia Pellin Cinemart: Omaggio al Cinema Italiano" (Auditorium Parco della Musica, Rome, 2013).

Notes

External links 
 Alain's introduction
 Cinzia Pellin
 Paolo Vegas
 Paolo Vegas I quattro elementi
 Fausto Nazer
 Sergio Comacchio Fuggenti bellezze
 Marco Novati

Material by Chivilò 
 Paolo Vegas italian press
 Paolo Vegas italian press
 Paolo Vegas italian press
 Paolo Vegas italian press
 Paolo Vegas italian press
 Omar Galliani italian press
 Anna Reber
 Daniela Rebuzzi Movimenti
 Karin Monschauer Universi Geometrici
 Karin Monschauer Universi Geometrici English Text
 Vittoria Chierici Selected press

Italian art critics
Italian art curators
Living people
1969 births
Writers from Venice
Writers from Milan
Curators from Milan